Steve, Steven or Stephen Wade may refer to:

Stephen Wade (executioner) (1887–1956), British executioner
Steve Wade (singer), Australian singer-songwriter and former member of Little River Band
Steven C. Wade (born 1983), American video games developer
Stephen Wade (born 1960), Australian politician
Stephen Wade (musician) (born 1953), American folk musician